Personal care or toiletries are consumer products used in personal hygiene, personal grooming or for beautification.

Products

Personal care includes products as diverse as cleansing pads, colognes, cotton swabs, cotton pads, deodorant, eye liner, facial tissue, hair clippers, lip gloss, lipstick, lip balm, lotion, makeup, hand soap, facial cleanser, body wash, nail files, pomade, perfumes, razors, shaving cream, moisturizer, baby powder, toilet paper, toothpaste, facial treatments, wet wipes, towels, and shampoo.

Hotel application
Typical toiletries offered at many hotels include:
 small bar of soap
 disposable shower cap
 small bottle of moisturizer
 small bottles of shampoo and conditioner
 toilet paper
 box of facial tissue
 face towels
 disposable shoe polishing cloth
 Toothpaste
 Toothbrush
 Cologne

Corporations
Some of the major corporations in the personal care industry are:
 

Other corporations, such as pharmacies (e.g. CVS/pharmacy, Walgreens) primarily retail in personal care rather than manufacture personal care products themselves.

Environmental impacts

See also
 Cosmetics
 Sachet
 Toiletry kit

References

Personal hygiene products
 
Bathrooms